Cryptolepis oblongifolia, the red-stemmed milk rope, is a multi-stemmed shrub in the family Apocynaceae. It is native to moist and mesic regions of southern Africa, where it occurs in rocky grassland, grassy woodland or riverine vegetation. It is found from South Africa to Zambia. It grows about 1m tall, and carries widely spaced, opposite leaves on the reddish-brown stems. The yellow to reddish-yellow flowers appear in axillary clusters.

References

External links

 

Periplocoideae